Vuk Kostić (born 22 November 1979) is a Serbian actor. He is famous for his roles in movies Apsolutnih 100, Stvar srca, "Ubice mog oca" and Klopka.

Private life 
He is the son of actor Mihajlo Kostić and Gordana.

Selected filmography

Awards 
 Thessaloniki Film Festival
2001: Best Actor (Apsolutnih 100) - WON
 Festival du Film de Paris
2002: Best Actor (Apsolutnih 100) - WON

References

External links 
 

Serbian male film actors
1979 births
Living people
Male actors from Belgrade
20th-century Serbian male actors
21st-century Serbian male actors
Serbian male television actors